Shapuri Bridge or Broken Bridge (in Lurish called: طاقِ پیلِ اِشکِسَه) is a historical bridge from Sassanid era located in the south of Khorramabad in Lorestan province.
The bridge has 28 arches (of which only 6 remain) and 27 Pile bridges, each 61 square meters; five of its arches are intact and the others have been destroyed by natural factors.
The arches of the bridge have been constructed of stone, whereas the bridge itself is a mixture of stone and mortar.
Shapoori Bridge is registered on the list of National Monuments.

References 

Buildings and structures in Khorramabad
Bridges in Iran
Sasanian architecture
Tourist attractions in Khorramabad